Test track may refer to:

 Test Track, a slot car attraction in Future World at Walt Disney World Resort's Epcot in Orlando, Florida
 Lego Technic Test Track, a rollercoaster
 TestTrack, computer software for managing requirements, defects, issues and testing activity
 Railway test track
 SpaceX Hypertube test track

See also
 
 Proving ground
 TrackTest